Til Death Do Us Unite is the eighth studio album by German thrash metal band Sodom, released on 24 February 1997 by Steamhammer/SPV. It had a controversial album cover, showing the bellies of a naked pregnant woman and an obese man pressing a human skull together. It is the first Sodom album with guitarist Bernermann and drummer Bobby Schottkowski.

A video was made for the song "Fuck the Police".

Track listing

The track "Hazy Shade of Winter" was originally written by Paul Simon. Sodom intended it to be a cover of the version previously performed by the Bangles.

Personnel
Sodom
 Tom Angelripper – vocals, bass
 Bernd "Bernemann" Kost – guitars
 Bobby Schottkowski – drums

Additional musician
 Alex Kraft - guitar solo on "Hey, Hey, Hey Rock 'N' Roll Star"

Production
 Harris Johns - producer
 Kai Blankenberg - remixing

References

1997 albums
Sodom (band) albums
SPV/Steamhammer albums
Albums produced by Harris Johns